William Powell Frith  (9 January 1819 – 2 November 1909) was an English painter specialising in genre subjects and panoramic narrative works of life in the Victorian era. He was elected to the Royal Academy in 1853, presenting The Sleeping Model as his Diploma work. He has been described as the "greatest British painter of the social scene since Hogarth".

Early life
William Powell Frith was born in Aldfield, near Ripon in the then West Riding of Yorkshire on 9 January 1819. He had originally intended to be an auctioneer. Frith was encouraged to take up art by his father, a hotelier in Harrogate. Frith was great uncle and an advisor to the English school portrait painter Henry Keyworth Raine (1872–1932).

He moved to London in 1835 where he began his formal art studies at Sass's Academy in Charlotte Street, before attending the Royal Academy Schools. Frith started his career as a portrait painter and first exhibited at the British Institution in 1838. In the 1840s he often based works on the literary output of writers such as Charles Dickens, whose portrait he painted (in 1859), and Laurence Sterne.

Career

He was a member of The Clique, which also included Richard Dadd. The principal influence on his work was the hugely popular domestic subjects painted by Sir David Wilkie. Wilkie's famous painting The Chelsea Pensioners was a spur to the creation of Frith's own most famous compositions. Following the precedent of Wilkie, but also imitating the work of his friend Dickens, Frith created complex multi-figure compositions depicting the full range of the Victorian class system, meeting and interacting in public places. In 'Ramsgate Sands' (also known as 'Life at the Seaside', 1854) he depicted visitors and entertainers at the seaside resort. He followed this with The Derby Day, depicting scenes among the crowd at the race at Epsom Downs, which was based on photographic studies by Robert Howlett. This 1858 composition was bought by Jacob Bell for £1,500. It was so popular that it had to be protected by a specially installed rail when shown at the Royal Academy of Arts. Another well-known painting was The Railway Station, a scene of Paddington station. In 1865 he was chosen to paint the marriage of the Prince of Wales (later King Edward VII) and Princess Alexandra of Denmark.

His 1858 painting The Crossing Sweeper has been described as breaking "new ground in its description of the collision of wealth and poverty on a London street."

Later in his career he painted two series of five pictures each, telling moral stories in the manner of William Hogarth. These were the Road to Ruin (1878), about the dangers of gambling, and the Race for Wealth (1880) about reckless financial speculation. He retired from the Royal Academy in 1890 but continued to exhibit until 1902.

Frith was a traditionalist who made known his aversion to modern-art developments in a couple of autobiographies – My Autobiography and Reminiscences (1887) and Further Reminiscences (1888) – and other writings. He was also an inveterate enemy of the Pre-Raphaelites and of the Aesthetic Movement, which he satirised in his painting A Private View at the Royal Academy (1883), in which Oscar Wilde is depicted discoursing on art while Frith's friends look on disapprovingly. Fellow traditionalist Frederic Leighton is featured in the painting, which also portrays painter John Everett Millais and novelist Anthony Trollope.

In his later years, he painted many copies of his famous paintings, as well as more sexually uninhibited works, such as the nude After the Bath. A well-known raconteur, his writings, most notably his chatty autobiography, were very popular.

In 1856, Frith was photographed at "The Photographed Institute" by Robert Howlett, as part of a series of portraits of "fine artists". The picture was among a group exhibited at the Art Treasures Exhibition in Manchester in 1857.

Frith died in 1909 aged 90 and is buried in Kensal Green Cemetery in London.

Exhibitions and legacy
The first major retrospective in Frith's native Britain for half a century was staged at the Guildhall Art Gallery, London in November 2006. It transferred to Mercer Art Gallery in Harrogate, North Yorkshire, in March 2007. Frith's study for his last major work, The Private View, 1881, is in the Mercer Art Gallery. His work was also shown at the Whitechapel Gallery in London during an exhibition running from 25 October – 1 December 1951. Frith has paintings in the collection of several British institutions including Derby Art Gallery, Sheffield, Harrogate and the Victoria and Albert Museum.

Personal life
Frith was married twice. He had twelve children with his first wife, Isabelle, whilst a mile down the road maintaining a mistress (Mary Alford, formerly his ward) and seven more children – all a marked contrast to the upright family scenes depicted in paintings like Many Happy Returns of the Day. Frith married Alford a year after the death of Isabelle in 1880. A daughter from his first family, Jane Ellen Panton, published Leaves of a life in 1908. It is a book of childhood reminiscences describing her father and the family's set of artist and literary friendships, chiefly members of The Clique. Walter Frith, the third son from William P. Frith's first marriage, was the author of fourteen plays and three novels.

Gallery

Writings
 My Autobiography and Reminiscences (1887). (BiblioBazaar reprint,)
 Further Reminiscences (1888).
 John Leech, His Life and Work, 2 vols. (1891).

References and sources
Citations

Sources

Further reading
Bills, Mark (2006). William Powell Frith: Painting the Victorian Age. Yale University Press. 
Wood, Christopher (2006). William Powell Frith: A Painter and His World. Sutton Publishing Ltd.

External links

 
 
 William Powell Frith at Artcyclopedia (images from various Museums and image galleries)
 
William Powell Frith page at the Mercer Art Gallery, Harrogate.
William Powell Frith chronology at the Mercer Art Gallery, Harrogate. Archived here.
 Profile on Royal Academy of Arts Collections

 La Sacristía del Caminante: ‘Sherry, Sir?’ de William Powell Frith y las Bodegas Williams & Humbert.

1819 births
1909 deaths
Royal Academicians
19th-century English painters
English male painters
20th-century English painters
English portrait painters
People from Harrogate
Burials at Kensal Green Cemetery
20th-century English male artists
19th-century English male artists